Joseph Edward Bryan (born 17 September 1993) is an English professional footballer who plays as a left-back for Ligue 1 club Nice, on loan from   club Fulham. He is also capable as a left-sided midfielder and left-sided wing-back. He has also made over 200 appearances for his hometown club Bristol City, as well as having loan spells with Bath City and Plymouth Argyle.

Club career

Bristol City
Bryan was born and raised in the area of Bristol. He came through his local team's youth levels; signing his first professional contract in 2011, agreeing terms to be a Bristol City player for at least two years.

On 24 November 2011, Bryan joined Conference National side Bath City on a two-month loan deal, effectively lasting until January. He scored in a 3–1 win over A.F.C. Telford United.

He made his professional debut for Bristol City on 6 March 2012, in a 3–2 win over Leicester City at Ashton Gate. In March 2013, he joined Plymouth Argyle on loan until the end of the season. Bryan made his debut for Plymouth the same day against Bradford City and scored his first Football League goal at Chesterfield in April.

He returned to Bristol City at the end of the season having played on the left side of midfield in ten consecutive games for Argyle. Bryan scored his first goal for City in the Bristol derby with Rovers in September, and his first league goal for the club came in November against Crawley Town. In June 2015 he signed a contract extension keeping him at Bristol City until 2019. The 2016–17 campaign saw Joe Bryan become statistically the best left back in the division.

Bryan starred in City's 2017–18 EFL Cup run to the semi finals, scoring the third goal in a 4–1 win against Premier League side Crystal Palace and then going on to score the first goal in the club's 2–1 win against Manchester United in the 2017–2018 EFL Cup quarter final at Ashton Gate.

Fulham
On 9 August 2018, Bryan signed for newly promoted Premier League club Fulham for a transfer fee reported to be in the region of £6 million. He had already undergone a medical at then-Championship side Aston Villa, but received a phone call stating Fulham's offer had been accepted, he stated that he was "15, 20 minutes away from signing" for Villa but opted to join Fulham to play Premier League football. He scored his first goal for Fulham in an EFL Cup tie against Millwall on 25 September 2018. On 4 August 2020, Bryan scored twice in extra-time in the Championship play-off Final at Wembley Stadium to send Fulham back up to the Premier League after a one-year absence, with the first one being a long-range direct free kick.

International career
Bryan was selected by the Scotland national under-21 football team in October 2012, but could not play due to a concussion he received playing for Bristol City against Leeds United. He remains eligible for Scotland through his parents but has not been selected for any squads subsequently.

Personal life
Joe's father, Alan, is a cardiac surgeon, specializing in aortic surgery. In 2017, Alan famously performed a successful surgery on football manager Lee Johnson's father Gary. Coincidentally, Lee was managing Bristol City at that time, and Joe was one of his players. This sparked theories among fans that Joe was only picked into the team because his father saved his manager's father's life. However, he later denied these claims, saying "Hopefully, people will begin to see I’m quite good at football, perhaps."

His sister, Lucy, is a pole vaulter.

Career statistics

Honours
Bristol City
Football League One: 2014–15
Football League Trophy: 2014–15

Fulham
EFL Championship: 2021–22
EFL Championship play-offs: 2020

Individual
PFA Team of the Year: 2014–15 League One, 2019–20 Championship
Football League Young Player of the Month: February 2015

References

External links

1993 births
Living people
Footballers from Bristol
English people of Scottish descent
English footballers
Association football defenders
Bristol City F.C. players
Bath City F.C. players
Plymouth Argyle F.C. players
Fulham F.C. players
OGC Nice players
English Football League players
National League (English football) players
Premier League players
Ligue 1 players
English expatriate footballers
English expatriate sportspeople in France
Expatriate footballers in France